"Pioneers! O Pioneers!" is a poem by the American poet Walt Whitman. It was first published in Leaves of Grass in 1865. The poem was written as a tribute to Whitman's fervor for the great Westward expansion in the United States that led to things like the California Gold Rush and exploration of the far west.


The Poem

Analysis 
Whitman's poem was written as an ode to the pioneers who had set out in search of a more fulfilling life by settling in the American West. Throughout the poem Whitman pays homage to the pioneers' courage and fearless choice to set out to find a brighter future. Whitman's use of elements such as allegory, and imagery, present his support for the pioneers and manifest destiny. The poem deals with perseverance and the enthusiasm towards exploration in America as compared to “Western youths” which refers to the young United States, and “Elder races” which refers to the European countries “shrouded bards of other lands” that once had the opportunity to explore the western territory. In the poem the myth of the west, which was incredibly important in the bringing up of the United States, acts as a continuum linking the past to the future; showing the potential of the new America.  By using the first person plural Whitman writes about the duties to be carried out by the pioneers; this style of using first person plural gives the poem a strong emotional appeal, which in return gives the reader a stronger connection to the poem.

A strong sense of unity can be felt by Whitman's repetition of the word "we" introducing the reader to the idea that everyone is a pioneer, and it promotes the idea that the reader is part of the poem. "O you daughters of the West! O you young and elder daughters! O you mothers and you wives! Never must you be divided, in our ranks you move united, Pioneers! O pioneers!" This is another example of how Whitman puts a strong emphasis on unity in the poem, it is not targeted towards men only, he is calling out to every individual making the migration to the west. The poem was written during the frontier era, which did not draw to a close until the latter part of the 19th century, so the figure of the pioneer in the poem could be read both from a literal standpoint as well as symbolic. The poem is also a representation of the revolutionary war through the description of the youthful race of America going up against the older generation in order to shape the future of the country."See my children, resolute children,By those swarms upon our rear we must never yield or falter,Ages back in ghostly millions frowning there behind us urging,Pioneers! O pioneers!", Whitman calls out to the young pioneers telling them to go where no man has gone before. By using the same allegorical metaphor to represent manifest destiny and America as a country Whitman shows that his passion for exploration wasn’t limited to what he could do by himself.

Whitman uses imagery to paint a picture in the minds of his readers; with his use of objects and places Whitman helps his readers get a feel for what lies ahead in the poem. For example, the line  “Down the edges, through the passes, up the mountains steep” refers to the pioneers forging the trails and often crossing difficult terrain, they had to create new lives for themselves through hard work and sacrifice, making it possible for others to follow in their footsteps. Whitman's imagery assists the readers' understanding of the poem by explaining how hard the work was and why it was important. His imagery and emotional appeal makes it possible for him to achieve the total effect of his poem and project the meaning to the reader. Whitman shows pride toward the pioneers and shows his admiration for the new youthful and promising country, and he uses this poem as a tribute to explain why they must go forth and why they are to be honored The poem still applies to today's society by the fact that the poem is versatile - present day readers can also draw information and motivation from it.

Poetic structure 
The poem consists of 26 four-line stanzas; each stanza is made up of one short line, two longer lines, and another short line. Within each shorter line there are two strongly accented syllables or syllable groups. In terms of units, the longer lines are made up of 2 units and the shorter lines made of 1. Each long line contains 4 heavily accented syllables and breaks in half with a caesura, which is usually marked with a comma; each of the halves consists of two heavily accented syllables like each beginning and ending line.

Similar pieces 
Some of Whitman's most notable poems came out around the same time as "Pioneers! O Pioneers!" Poems such as "Song of the Broad Axe", which dealt with similar themes like Americas westward expansion, and O Captain! My Captain! which sported similar poetic structure to the pioneers poem and dealt with similar time period content.  All the pieces mentioned belong to the 1850s and 1860s, which was a time of growth and development in America through and after the Civil War. Pioneers! O Pioneers! was one of the many works written by Whitman at the time that worked as a literary driving force for the American people.

Publication history

"Pioneers! O Pioneers!" was first published in his 1865 book Drum-Taps and was subsequently also published in the 1867 U.S. edition of Leaves of Grass. Whitman made constant revisions to Leaves of Grass throughout its publications and in doing so transferred the poem to different sections in the various collections. In the 1867 edition the poem had its own page and was not under a topic poem heading. The poem could be found under the section heading of "Marches Now The War is Over" in the 1871-1872 edition, and in the 1881-1882 edition, which could and could not be in some opinions considered Whitman's last, many scholars will argue that 1876, 1888–89, and 1891-92 (the "deathbed edition") were the final editions, the poem could be found under the heading "Birds of Passage".

In popular culture
A portion of the poem, read by Will Geer, along with the 1890 recording of Whitman's reading of his poem "America" were used in a series of Levi's commercials directed by Cary Fukunaga and M. Blash, shown on television and in movie theaters, in several US and Canadian markets in late 2009.

During the 2013 NCAA Division I FBS football season The Pac-12 Conference used selections of the poem in their commercial promoting the Pac-12 Network and their schools in the Western United States.

The title of the 3rd season finale of SyFy's Defiance, "Upon The March We Fittest Die", was taken from the 14th stanza.

The poem is referenced in the title of Willa Cather's 1913 novel O Pioneers!

References

Poetry by Walt Whitman
1865 poems
Works about human migration